Juan Carreño Lara (14 August 1909 – 16 December 1940) was a Mexican footballer, and a participant of the 1930 FIFA World Cup. He was the first Mexican to score in the FIFA World Cup. During this tournament he was connected with Atlante F.C. He also scored Mexico's first goal in Olympic Games in Amsterdam 1928. He died of appendicitis aged 31.

International goals
Mexico's goal tally first

References

Sources 
  A.Gowarzewski : "FUJI Football Encyclopedia. World Cup FIFA*part I*Biographical Notes - Heroes of Mundials" ; GiA Katowice 1993
 Match report

1909 births
1940 deaths
Footballers from Mexico City
Mexican footballers
Mexico international footballers
1930 FIFA World Cup players
Footballers at the 1928 Summer Olympics
Olympic footballers of Mexico
Atlante F.C. footballers
Deaths from appendicitis
Association football forwards